Zeev Nehari (born Willi Weissbach; 2 February 1915 – 1978) was a mathematician who worked on Complex Analysis, Univalent Functions Theory and Differential and Integral Equations. He was a student of Michael (Mihály) Fekete. The Nehari manifold is named after him.

Selected publications

Nehari, Zeev (1952), "Some inequalities in the theory of functions", Transactions of the American Mathematical Society, 1953, Vol.75, pp. 256–286.

References

External links

1915 births
1978 deaths
Jewish emigrants from Nazi Germany to Mandatory Palestine
20th-century Israeli  mathematicians